Roberta Pinotti (born 20 May 1961) is an Italian politician, member of the Democratic Party. From 22 February 2014 to 1 June 2018 she served as the Italian Minister of Defence in the governments of Matteo Renzi and Paolo Gentiloni.

Early life 
Roberta Pinotti was born in Genoa, in 1961; she holds a degree in modern literature at the University of Genoa and is a teacher of Italian in high schools.

During her adolescence, she was a member of the Association of Italian Catholic Guides and Scouts.

Political career
She began her political career at the end of the 1980s as a district counselor of Italian Communist Party. She later joined the Democratic Party of the Left, the Democrats of the Left party (in which she held the position of provincial secretary between 1999 and 2001) and the Democratic Party. In her hometown she has served as councilor for school, youth policies and social policies (1993–1997) and for educational institutions (1997–1999).

First elected deputy in 2001, Pinotti was the shadow minister of defense in the Shadow Cabinet of Walter Veltroni between May 2008 and April 2009.

In 2012 she was a candidate for the centre-left primary election to become Mayor of Genoa, but she arrived only third after the leftist Marco Doria and the upcoming Mayor Marta Vincenzi.

In 2013 she was appointed undersecretary of state (sottosegretario di stato) in the Ministry of Defence in the government led by Enrico Letta.

After her stint as Minister of Defence, Pinotti became a Senator of the Democratic Party of Italy.

Minister of Defence
When the new Secretary of the Democratic Party Matteo Renzi forced Letta to resign and became the new Prime Minister on 22 February 2014, he appointed Pinotti as Minister of Defence; she is the first woman to have ever held this office in Italy.

Her first act was to meet the wives of the two Italian marines detained in India, due to the Enrica Lexie case.

She received the America Award of the Italy-USA Foundation in 2014.

In October 2014 she visited the United Arab Emirates and met with Deputy Supreme Commander of the Armed Forces Crown Prince Mohammed bin Zayed Al Nahyan in order to strengthen the bilateral relations with regards to the Defense. In February 2015 she returned to the United Arab Emirates in occasion of the International Defence Industry Exhibition (IDEX), attended by several Italian companies, and met again with Mohammed bin Zayed Al Nahyan.

She received criticism in February 2015 over navy recruitment adverts which used slogans written in English.
Later that month she hinted that Italy was ready to lead a coalition force to defeat ISIS in Libya, saying: “We have been discussing it for months, but now an intervention has become urgent.”

On 12 December 2016, when Renzi resigned as Prime Minister after the constitutional referendum, Pinotti was confirmed as Defence Minister by the new Prime Minister Paolo Gentiloni.

In 2017 the Parliament approved the so-called "White Book", a plan of reorganization of the heads of the Ministry of Defence and the related structures; the plan also provided a reform of the Italian Armed Forces and a reorganization of the training system.

References

External links 

 

1961 births
21st-century Italian women politicians
Democratic Party (Italy) politicians
Democratic Party of the Left politicians
Democrats of the Left politicians
Deputies of Legislature XIV of Italy
Deputies of Legislature XV of Italy
Female defence ministers
Italian Communist Party politicians
Italian Ministers of Defence
Italian Roman Catholics
Living people
Politicians from Genoa
Renzi Cabinet
Senators of Legislature XVI of Italy
Senators of Legislature XVII of Italy
Senators of Legislature XVIII of Italy
University of Genoa alumni
Women government ministers of Italy
20th-century Italian women
Women members of the Chamber of Deputies (Italy)
Women members of the Senate of the Republic (Italy)